The WMG Academy for Young Engineers (Solihull) is a mixed university technical college in Solihull which opened in 2016. It caters for students aged 14–19 years.

The Academy is part of the same trust as the WMG Academy for Young Engineers, Coventry. It is sponsored by WMG, University of Warwick.

References

External links 
 WMG Academy for Young Engineers (Solihull) official site

Secondary schools in Solihull
Educational institutions established in 2016
2016 establishments in England
University Technical Colleges